Electronic Meditation is the debut album by German electronic music group Tangerine Dream. It was released in June 1970 by record label Ohr.

Recording and history

The album was recorded in a rented factory in Berlin in October 1969, using just a two-track Revox tape recorder.

Electronic Meditation is the only Tangerine Dream album to feature the line-up of Edgar Froese, Klaus Schulze and Conrad Schnitzler. Two other musicians, organist Jimmy Jackson and flautist Thomas Keyserling, also performed on the album although they were uncredited in the original release.

Content 

Its style is a unique form of free jazz, electronic art music, and instrumental rock; or as Sound on Sound magazine described it, "free electronic rock". Its instrumentation ranges from conventional instruments such as the guitar, organ, drums, and cello to various custom-made electronic devices implemented by Edgar Froese and found sounds such as broken glass, burning parchment, and dried peas being shaken in a sieve. The backwards vocals at the end of side B are of Edgar Froese reading from the back of a ferry ticket from Dover to Calais. The first five albums released by Ohr Records, including Electronic Meditation, featured sleeves by Reinhard Hippen, all with dismembered baby doll parts as a central aspect of the imagery. The original LP had a balloon inserted in the cover; the 2004 Japan CD release is a copy of the original LP cover and includes the balloon.

Reception 

In its retrospective review, AllMusic wrote: "The album is not without its flaws, but it's strong in many ways and shows abundant promise". Stephen Dalton in his review for Classic Rock described the album as "more an historically interesting cult curio than essential Krautrock milestone", reminding however that "from sketchy but seminal basement tapes like these, an entire cosmos of sound was mapped."

Track listing

Personnel
Tangerine Dream
 Edgar Froese – six- and twelve-string guitar, organ, piano, sound effects, tapes
 Conrad Schnitzler – cello, violin, addiator
 Klaus Schulze – drums, percussion, metal sticks
Additional personnel
 Jimmy Jackson – organ (uncredited in the original release)
 Thomas Keyserling – flute (uncredited in the original release)

References

External links 

 

1970 debut albums
Krautrock albums
Tangerine Dream albums
Ohr (record label) albums
Albums produced by Edgar Froese
Albums produced by Klaus Schulze
Albums produced by Conrad Schnitzler